Zelamkhin-Kotar (Zelamxin-Khotar), also known by Russian name Oktyabrskoye, is a rural locality (a selo) in Vedensky District, Chechnya.

Administrative and municipal status 
Municipally, Zelamkhin-Kotar is incorporated into Vedenskoye rural settlement. It is one of the four settlements included in it.

Geography 

Zelamkhin-Kotar is located between the Khulkhulau and Akhkinchu rivers. It is on the northern outskirts of the village of Vedeno.

The nearest settlements to Zelamkhin-Kotar are Tsa-Vedeno in the north-west, Agishbatoy in the north-east, Vedeno in the south, and Elistanzhi and Eshilkhatoy in the south-west.

History 
The village of Zelamkhin-Kotar was originally formed by immigrants from the villages of Eshilkhatoy and Kharachoy. Later, around 10 families moved from Tsa-Vedeno to Zelamkhin-Kotar due to landslides.

Population 
 1990 Census: 780
 2002 Census: 839
 2010 Census: 1167
 2019 estimate: ?

According to the results of the 2010 census, the majority of residents of Zelamkhin-Kotar were ethnic Chechens.

References 

Rural localities in Vedensky District